The La Roche-sur-Yon International Film Festival is a film festival created in 2001. Renewed in 2010, it takes place every year in mid-October in the town of La Roche-sur-Yon in Vendée, France. In 2017, it attracted an estimated 24,000 attendees from October 16 to 22, an increase of 10% compared to the year before (22,000).

Award categories
 Special Jury Prize
 Grand Jury Prize CINÉ+
 Mention of the International Competition
 New Wave Awards
 Jury Special Mention News Waves
 Trajectory Awards
 Audience Award

References

External links 
 

French culture
Festivals in France
Film festivals in France
Film festivals established in 2001